The 1976 Winter Olympics, officially known as the XII Olympic Winter Games and commonly known as Innsbruck 1976, was a winter multi-sport event celebrated in Innsbruck, Austria, from February 4 to 15, 1976. The Games were awarded to Innsbruck after Denver, the original host city, withdrew in 1972. This was the second time the Tyrolean capital had hosted the Winter Olympics, having first done so in 1964.

Host selection

The cities of Denver, Colorado, United States; Sion, Switzerland; Tampere, Finland; and Vancouver (with most events near Mount Garibaldi), British Columbia, Canada, made bids for the Games. The host was decided at the 69th IOC meeting in Amsterdam, Netherlands, on May 12, 1970.

In a statewide referendum on 7 November 1972, Colorado voters rejected funding for the games, and for the first (and only) time a city awarded the Winter Games rejected them. Denver officially withdrew on 15 November, and the IOC then offered the games to Whistler, British Columbia, Canada, but they too declined owing to a change of government following elections. Salt Lake City offered to host the games, but the IOC, still reeling from the Denver rejection, declined and selected Innsbruck to host the 1976 Winter Olympics, which had hosted the 1964 Winter Olympics games twelve years earlier, on 5 February 1973.

Mascot

The mascot of the 1976 Winter Olympics was Schneemann, a snowman in a red Tyrolean hat.  Designed by Walter Pötsch, Schneeman was purported to represent the 1976 Games as the "Games of Simplicity".  It was also regarded as a good-luck charm, to avert the dearth of snow that had marred the 1964 Winter Olympics in Innsbruck.

Highlights

 First Games under the presidency of Michael Morris, 3rd Baron Killanin
Austrian favorite Franz Klammer won the men's downhill event in alpine skiing in 1:45.73, after great pressure from his country and defending champion Bernhard Russi of Switzerland.
Dorothy Hamill of the US won the gold in figure Skating, and inspired the popular "wedge" haircut.
Elegant British figure skater John Curry altered his routine to appeal to Olympic judges, winning gold.
American figure skater Terry Kubicka attempted – and completed – a dangerous backflip in figure skating.
Rosi Mittermaier of West Germany nearly swept the women's alpine skiing events, earning two golds and a silver, missing the third gold by 0.13 seconds.
Soviet speed skater Tatiana Averina won four medals.
In the 4-man bobsled, the East German team won the first of three consecutive titles.
The USSR won its fourth straight ice hockey gold medal; for the second consecutive Olympics, Canada refused to send a team, protesting the rules that allowed the USSR to field professional players while limiting Canada to amateurs. Sweden also joined the boycott.
Sports technology, in the guise of innovative perforated skis, sleek hooded suits and streamlined helmets appeared in alpine skiing, speed skating and ski jumping, making headlines in Innsbruck.
A second cauldron for the Olympic flame was built to represent the 1976 Games. Both it and the cauldron from the 1964 games were lit together.
Bobsleigh and luge competed on the same track for the first time ever.
Galina Kulakova of the Soviet Union finished 3rd in the women's 5 km ski event, but was disqualified due to a positive test for banned substance ephedrine. She claimed that this was a result of using the nasal spray that contained the substance. Both the FIS and the IOC allowed her to compete in the 10 km and the 4×5 km relay. This was the first stripped medal at the Winter Olympics.
The Austrian anthem was played three times at the closing ceremony during the beginning, the victory ceremony and the handover ceremony to honor the three verses of the anthem.

Venues

Axamer Lizum – Alpine skiing except men's downhill
Bergiselschanze – Ski jumping (large hill), Opening Ceremonies 
Eisschnellaufbahn – Speed skating
Kombinierte Kunsteisbahn für Bob-Rodel Igls – Bobsleigh, Luge
Messehalle – Ice hockey
Olympiahalle – Figure skating, Ice hockey, Closing Ceremonies
Patscherkofel – Alpine skiing (men's downhill)
Seefeld – Biathlon, Cross-country skiing, Nordic combined, Ski jumping (normal hill)

Medals awarded
There were 37 events contested in 6 sports (10 disciplines).
Ice dance made its Olympic debut.
See the medal winners, ordered by sport:

Participating nations
37 nations participated in the 1976 Winter Olympic Games. The games marked the final time the Republic of China (Taiwan) participated under the Republic of China flag and name. After most of the international community recognized the People's Republic of China as the legitimate government of all China, the ROC was forced to compete under the name Chinese Taipei, under an altered flag and to use its National Banner Song instead of its national anthem. Andorra and San Marino participated in their first Winter Olympic Games.

Number of athletes by National Olympic Committees

Medal count

These are the top ten nations that won medals at the 1976 Winter Games.

Documentary film
In 1977, White Rock, a documentary film about the Innsbruck Winter Olympics was released. The film was narrated by James Coburn, and directed by Tony Maylam. It was nominated for the Robert Flaherty Award (Feature Length Film, Documentary In Content) at the 30th British Academy Film Awards. The film's soundtrack was composed by English keyboardist Rick Wakeman. His album, White Rock entered the UK Albums Chart on 12 February 1977, where it spent 9 weeks and reached number 14.

See also

References
Notes

Citations

External links

 
O
Sports competitions in Innsbruck
Olympic Games in Austria
Winter multi-sport events in Austria
1976 in Austrian sport
Winter Olympics by year
February 1976 sports events in Europe
1970s in Innsbruck